Aphendala ferreogrisea is a moth of the family Limacodidae first described by Edward Meyrick in 1913. It is found in Sri Lanka, and Australia.

Forewings dark grayish brown. A dentate medial fasciae found in the forewing. A distinct discal spot present.

References

External links
Systematic account of South-east Asian pest Limacodidae

Moths of Asia
Moths described in 1913
Limacodidae